Ville Neuve is a Canadian animated drama film, directed by Félix Dufour-Laperrière and released in 2018. Using ink on paper animation, the film stars Robert Lalonde and Johanne-Marie Tremblay as Joseph and Emma, a divorced couple who reconnect during the 1995 Quebec referendum campaign.

The cast also includes Théodore Pellerin, Gildor Roy and Paul Ahmarani.

The film's screenplay was adapted in part from Raymond Carver's short story "Chef's House".

The film premiered at the 75th Venice International Film Festival in September 2018, and had its Canadian premiere at the Ottawa International Animation Festival. It went into general theatrical release in 2019.

References

External links 
 

2018 films
Canadian animated feature films
Films set in Quebec
Canadian drama films
French-language Canadian films
2010s Canadian films